Year 1020 (MXX) was a leap year starting on Friday (link will display the full calendar) of the Julian calendar.

Events 
 Summer – Emperor Henry II conducts his third Italian military campaign. He makes plans to invade the south, but remains non-committal.
 June 15 – Byzantine troops under Catepan Basil Boioannes (supported by his ally Prince Pandulf IV) capture the fortress of Troia.
 The French city of Saint-Germain-en-Laye is founded by King Robert II (the Pious).
 King Canute the Great codifies the laws of England (approximate date).
 King Gagik I of Armenia is succeeded by Hovhannes-Smbat III.

Births
 Almodis de la Marche, French noblewoman (d. 1071)
 Beatrice of Bar, French duchess and regent (d. 1076)
 Benno II, German bishop and architect (approximate date)
 Bernard of Menthon, French priest and saint (d. 1081)
 Conrad I (or Cuno), duke of Bavaria (approximate date)
 Filarete of Calabria, Sicilian saint (approximate date)
 Gonzalo Sánchez, Spanish nobleman (approximate date)
 Gunhilda of Denmark, German queen (approximate date)
 Guo Xi, Chinese landscape painter (approximate date)
 Hallvard Vebjørnsson, Norwegian saint (approximate date)
 Kunigunde of Altdorf, German noblewoman (approximate date)
 Maria of Gaeta, Italian noblewoman (approximate date)
 Osbern Giffard, Norman nobleman (approximate date)
 Otto of Nordheim, duke of Bavaria (approximate date)
 Stephen IX, pope of the Catholic Church (approximate date)
 Su Song, Chinese statesman and scientist (d. 1101)
 Sweyn Godwinson, English nobleman (approximate date)
 Vladimir Yaroslavich, Grand Prince of Kiev (d. 1052)
 William I (the Great), count of Burgundy (d. 1087)
 William Busac, English nobleman (jure uxoris) (d. 1076)
 William FitzOsbern, 1st Earl of Hereford (approximate date)
 William of Poitiers, French priest and writer (d. 1090)
 Wulfhild of Norway, duchess consort of Saxony (d. 1071)
 Zhang Zai, Chinese philosopher and cosmologist (d. 1077)

Deaths 
 June 12 – Lyfing, archbishop of Canterbury
 June 15 – Dattus (or Datto), Lombard rebel leader
 August 16 – Zhou Huaizheng, Chinese eunuch
 Al-Mu'ayyad Ahmad, Muslim imam (b. 944)
 Al-Sijzi, Persian mathematician (approximate date)
 Bernard I (Taillefer), Spanish nobleman
 Bouchard II (the Bearded), French nobleman (b. 975)
 Einar Sigurdsson, Norse Viking nobleman
 Ferdowsi, Persian poet and author (b. 940)
 Gagik I, king of Bagratid Armenia (approximate date)
 Gerald I (Tranche-Lion), French nobleman
 Gojslav, king of Croatia (approximate date)
 Leif Ericson, Norse Viking explorer (approximate date)
 Melus of Bari, Lombard nobleman and rebel leader
 Radim Gaudentius, Polish archbishop (b. 970)
 Stephen I of Vermandois, French nobleman
 Trdat the Architect, Armenian chief architect

References